Priapella compressa, the Palenque priapella, is a species of freshwater fish within the family Poeciliidae. It is found in the Rio Grijalva system to the lower Rio Usumacinta basin in Chiapas in Mexico.

References

Wischnath, L., 1993. Atlas of livebearers of the world. T.F.H. Publications, Inc., United States of America. 336 p.

compressa
Freshwater fish of Mexico
Taxa named by Jose Álvarez del Villar
Fish described in 1948